The Empire Exhibition, South Africa, held in Johannesburg, was intended to mark that city's jubilee and was opened by the Governor-General of the Union of South Africa on 15 September 1936. It was the first exhibition held in the Union of South Africa following two earlier exhibitions in Cape Colony in 1877 and 1892. The idea of an empire exhibition in South Africa was first discussed in 1934 by the Buy Empire Committee of Johannesburg.  On 9 January 1935, the Grand Council of the Federation of British Industries passed a resolution for a proposal to hold an Empire Exhibition in Johannesburg in 1936 in conjunction with the Golden Jubilee of the city.

A site of 100 acres in Milner Park was secured for the exhibition. Here were built about 100 buildings including eight pavilions from foreign nations and eight main exhibition buildings, the largest being the Hall of Industries.

The Schlesinger African Air Race was held in conjunction with the exhibition, with I W Schlesinger giving £10,000 in prize money.

Participants

Over 500 exhibitors came from 18 nations around the world. Africa: Basutoland, Bechuanaland, Kenya, Nigeria, Nyasaland, Rhodesia, South Africa, Seychelles, Swaziland, Tanganyika, Uganda, Zanzibar  America: Canada, Trinidad  Asia: Ceylon  Europe: Great Britain  Oceania: Australia, New Zealand

There was a Palestine temple exhibition showing models of the Tabernacle of Moses, temples of Hadrian, Herod, Justinian, Solomon and Zrubabel, the mosque of Omar and a panorama of Jerusalem.

Provinces

The Western Province's exhibit was displayed in Cape House, designed in Cape Dutch style. This building became the staff club at the West Campus of the University of the Witwatersrand.

Organisations

The Victoria Falls and Transvaal Power Company (now Eskom) sponsored the building of an art deco tower made of reinforced concrete which overlooked the main axis of the fair. This remained standing after the fair and after a period of use as the north tower of a cable car system became a tuck shop and security office for the University of the Witwatersrand's west campus.
The Transvaal Chamber of Mines had a pavilion with dioramas, fountains, a pillar representing the gold output from the Witwatersrand mines from 1933 to 1935, and a life size replica of mine workings.
There was a hall of South African Industries, 
a South African Iron and Steel Industry pavilion,

Landscaping and leisure

There were rockeries designed by Pieter Hugo Naudé, an Afrikaner restaurant and the first ice rink in South Africa.

References

External links

  for a downloadable copy of The British South Africa Company Historical Catalogue & Souvenir of Rhodesia, Empire Exhibition, Johannesburg, 1936–37

1936 establishments in South Africa
1937 disestablishments in South Africa
20th century in Johannesburg
Festivals in Johannesburg
World's fairs in Africa
September 1936 events
1936 festivals
1937 festivals
South Africa and the Commonwealth of Nations
Colonial exhibitions